The 2001–02 Turkish Cup was the 43rd edition of the annual tournament that determined the association football Super League (Süper Lig) Turkish Cup champion under the auspices of the Turkish Football Federation (TFF). Kocaelispor successfully contested Beşiktaş by 4–0 in the final. The results of the tournament also determined which clubs would be promoted or relegated.

First round 

|}

Second round 

|}

Third round 

|}

Fourth round 

|}

Bracket

Quarter-finals 

|}

Semi-finals

Summary table 

|}

Matches

Final

References

External links 
 2001–02 Turkish Cup, tff.org
 2001–02 Turkish Cup, rsssf.com
 2001–02 Turkish Cup, mackolik.com

2001–02
Cup
2001–02 domestic association football cups